The 1946 Minnesota gubernatorial election took place on November 5, 1946. Incumbent governor Edward John Thye did not seek reelection and instead ran for the United States Senate. Republican Party of Minnesota candidate Luther Youngdahl defeated Minnesota Democratic–Farmer–Labor Party challenger Harold H. Barker. Hjalmar Petersen unsuccessfully ran for the Republican nomination.

Results

See also
 List of Minnesota gubernatorial elections

References

External links
 http://www.sos.state.mn.us/home/index.asp?page=653 
 http://www.sos.state.mn.us/home/index.asp?page=657 

Gubernatorial
1946
Minnesota
November 1946 events in the United States